Kilquhanity School was one of several free schools to have been established in the United Kingdom in the twentieth century.  Others include Sands School in Devon, Summerhill in Suffolk, Sherwood School in Epsom and Kirkdale School in London.

The school was founded by John Aitkenhead (1910-1998)  and his wife Morag in 1940. It was closed in 1997. It was located in a classical mansion house designed by the architect Walter Newall near the town of Kirkpatrick Durham in the historical county of Kirkcudbrightshire in Galloway. The school was reopened under head teacher and former pupil Andrew Pyle, with the support of a Japanese educational organisation Kinokuni Children's Village Schools (headed by Shinichiro Hori) which now owns the premises. The first intake of 12 pupils was expected in 2013. A previous attempt to reopen in 2009 failed to attract a financially viable number of pupils.

The school was visited in 1941 by the refugee Polish Jewish artist Jankel Adler who had been evacuated to Glasgow. The poet  W S Graham, who had earlier helped him translate an article on Paul Klee in Glasgow was working here at the time. He spent New Year 1942 here, Christopher Murray Grieve (Hugh MacDiarmid) whose son Michael  was a pupil here, was also present.

Philosophy 
The philosophy of Kilquhanity was heavily influenced by the writing and ideas of A. S. Neill, who founded Summerhill School, where Aitkenhead had worked; essentially that children learn best with freedom from coercion ("free-range").

Further reading 

 The Education Revolution #32 Spring/Summer 2001 (the magazine of the Alternative Education Resource Organization).
 Various authors.  Summerhill: For and Against, a collection of essays, arguing both in favour and against Summerhill's (and Kilquhanity's) approach.
 A.S. Neill.  Summerhill.  A book about the school and its philosophy, by the school's founder.

See also 
Free schools (disambiguation)
Democratic school
Collaborative learning

References

External links
Official web site
Alternative school to reopen BBC News channel, March 23, 2009
Unique school re-opens (Dumfries and Galloway Standard article, March 25, 2009)

Boarding schools in Dumfries and Galloway
Democratic education
1940 establishments in Scotland
Educational institutions established in 1940
Educational institutions disestablished in 1997
1997 disestablishments in Scotland